Juan Firpo (born 4 January 1938) is an Argentine sailor. He competed in the Finn event at the 1976 Summer Olympics.

References

External links
 

1938 births
Living people
Argentine male sailors (sport)
Olympic sailors of Argentina
Sailors at the 1976 Summer Olympics – Finn
Place of birth missing (living people)